Saint Gjon Vladimir's Church is a church in Shijon, Elbasan County, Albania. It is dedicated to the Dukljan prince and saint Jovan Vladimir, the son-in-law of the Bulgarian Tsar Samuil. It became a Cultural Monument of Albania in 1948. The first temple is the oldest large Orthodox basilica from the times of Tsar Samuil, rebuilt as present church by the Thopia family in 1381. During the 18th century Kostandin Shpataraku painted the walls of the church.

An Orthodox monastery grew around the church, and became the seat of the newly founded Archdiocese of Dyrrhachium in the 18th century. Gregory of Durrës, the archbishop of Dyrrhachium  from 1768 to 1772, wrote there the Elbasan Gospel Manuscript, the oldest work of Albanian Orthodox literature; the manuscript is also notable for being the only document in the Albanian Elbasan script.

References

Cultural Monuments of Albania
Buildings and structures in Elbasan
Churches in Albania